Vaadhoo ( Dhivehi: ވާދޫ    ) is an inhabited island of Gaafu Dhaalu region in the atoll of Huvadhu, Maldives. It has its own dialect of Maldivian, which is considerably different from northern and Mid-Maldivian speech.

History

Archaeology
Important Buddhist remains have been found on this island, including:
A ruined stupa called “Vaadhoo Bodu Havitta” is located on the north-east of the centre of the Island. It is about 90m in circumference and 12 m in height.

On the north-east of the centre of the island is another mount (Vaadhoo Kuda Havitta) which is about 40 m in circumference and 7 m in height.

An ancient cemetery knows as “Thunndey Ziyaarai” located on the north-west side of the Island.

“Vaadhoo Gale Misskih” an ancient Graveyard and a mosque located on the north-east of the centre of the Island.

“Vaadhoo Dhanna Kaleyfaanu Ziyaarai” known as the grave yard of “Mohamed Jamaaluddin” (Vaadhoo Dhanna Kaleyfaanu) who is one of the important scholars of Maldives.

“Vaadhoo Aasaaree Misskih” An old mosque where “Mohamed Jamaaluddin” (Vaadhoo Dhanna Kaleyfaanu) started his teachings with the help of Vaadhoo Katheeb (Mohamed Fadiyahthakuru).

"Bulhannaab" an ancient Graveyard located on the north-east side of the Island.

Thor Heyerdahl visited this island and investigated the ancient Buddhist ruins in the 1980s accompanied by Mohamed Lutfi. Some carved coral stones representing Buddha's foot (Buddhapada) include Vajrayana symbols that were found. However, the ruins have not been well researched yet.

Geography

Demography

Education
Vaadhoo Jamaaluddin School, a government primary and secondary school, which is the second primary school opened in Gdh Vaadhoo. The school is named after the famous religious scholar Mohamed Jamaluddin, better known as Vaadhoo Dhanna Kaleyfaanu and the first Educator of the Maldives.
The school first name was called "Vaadhoo Makthab" later changed for "Jamaaluddin School" and currently known as "Vaadhoo Jamaaluddin School".

References

H.C.P. Bell, The Maldive Islands; Monograph on the History, Archaeology and Epigraphy. Reprint Colombo 1940. Council for Linguistic and Historical Research. Male’ 1989 
Xavier Romero-Frias, The Maldive Islanders, A Study of the Popular Culture of an Ancient Ocean Kingdom. 1999,  
Skjølsvold, Arne. Archaeological Test-Excavations On The Maldive Islands. The Kon-Tiki Museum Occasional Papers, Vol. 2. Oslo 1991.

Islands of the Maldives
United Suvadive Republic